Christian Malheiros (born 14 August 1999) is a Brazilian actor. He is known for his award-winning performance in the 2018 drama film Sócrates, which was praised by critics and earned him a nomination for Best Male Lead at the 34th Independent Spirit Awards.

Career 
Malheiros started his career in theater at nine years old.

He made his feature film debut as a teenager in the 2018 drama film Sócrates, for which he was nominated for Best Male Lead at the 34th Independent Spirit Awards. The film traces the story of Sócrates, a black 15-year-old teenager from Santos, in the coast of São Paulo, as he has to overcome extreme poverty, the death of his mother, and homophobia. The film received critical acclaim after being released on the international film festival circuit. It was shortlisted for Brazil's official entry for the Academy Award for Best International Feature. 

Critics praised his performance in Sócrates. Writing for The Hollywood Reporter, critic Frank Scheck called his performance "stunning." In Variety, critic Dennis Harvey wrote "Malheiros’ terrific turn makes this protagonist credibly tough by necessity, and mature beyond his years." In The Los Angeles Times wrote that Malheiros' "facial gestures oscillate between stoicism and crushing wails." The New York Times wrote that "his charm and energy draw us immediately to his side."

In 2019, Malheiros began starring as Nando in the Brazilian crime teen drama streaming television series Sintonia, created and directed by Kondzilla, which premiered on Netflix on August 9, 2019. The series received positive reviews. In 2020, invited by Luiz Päetow, he starred as Angel in the Brazilian film Transmission, which premiered on September 20, 2020.

Filmography

Film

Television

Awards and nominations

References 

Brazilian film actors
2000 births
Living people
Actors from São Paulo (state)
People from Santos, São Paulo
Afro-Brazilian male actors